Allominettia is a genus of small flies of the family Lauxaniidae.

Species
A. bimaculata (Malloch, 1928)
A. corollae (Fabricius, 1805)
A. fuscipes (Macquart, 1843)
A. mactans (Fabricius, 1794)
A. maculatifrons Hendel, 1925
A. pulchrifrons (Hendel, 1926)
A. woldae (Broadhead, 1989)

References

Lauxaniidae
Schizophora genera
Taxa named by Friedrich Georg Hendel
Diptera of South America